This is a list of holidays in Gabon.
January 1: New Year's Day
Variable: Easter Monday
April 17: Women's Day, marks the death anniversary of Rose Francine Rogombé, the first female head of state of Gabon.
May 1: Labour Day
Variable: Ascension Day
Variable: Whit Monday
August 15: Assumption Day
August 16–17: Independence Day, from France, August 17, 1960.
Variable: Eid al-Fitr
Variable: Eid al-Adha
November 1: All Saints Day
December 25: Christmas Day

References 

Gabonese culture
Gabon
Gabon